Mark (or Marc) Rosenberg is the name of:

Marc Rosenberg (cricketer) (born 1982), South African cricketer
Marc Rosenberg (judge) (1950–2015), Canadian judge
Mark Rosenberg (producer) (1948–1992), film producer
Marc Rosenberg (screenwriter) (fl. 1980s–2010s), American screenwriter and producer
Mark B. Rosenberg (born 1949), academic
Mark Brennan Rosenberg (fl. 2000s–2010s), author and comedian
Mark Elijah Rosenberg, filmmaker and founder of the Rooftop Film Festival
Mark L. Rosenberg (born 1950), gun violence researcher

See also
Markus Rosenberg (born 1982)